Ruellia insignis is a species of plant in the family Acanthaceae. It is endemic to Yemen.

References

Endemic flora of Socotra
insignis
Least concern plants
Taxonomy articles created by Polbot
Taxa named by Isaac Bayley Balfour